Supari, titled Supari - Your Time Starts Now in the UK, is a 2003 Indian Hindi-language action film directed and produced by Padam Kumar. The film stars Uday Chopra, Rahul Dev, Nandita Das, Purab Kohli, Nauheed Cyrusi and Irrfan Khan. The story is set in the Mumbai underworld, and follows four friends who become contract killers after losing a bet to an underworld figure.

Released theatrically on 20 June 2003, it was also the first Hindi-language film to be later distributed online via Kazaa. Although the film was not commercially successful, the performances were praised.

Plot
Aryan Pandit lives a middle-class lifestyle with his family in Nasik, India, where the entire family depend on his salesman father's earnings. He relocates to Mumbai's St. Andrews College with big dreams of being wealthy and driving a red Ferrari. He befriends three other middle-class youth: Papad, Mushy, and Chicken. He borrows money from Matka Rajan, gambles it, loses everything, and is unable to re-pay. As a result, Rajan sets his goons on him.

Aryan goes to a man named Baba for help, who in turn takes him to Mamta Sekhari. Sekhari offers to hire him as a hit man, agreeing to pay him 20,000 rupees for every killing, so that he can re-pay his gambling loan. Aryan reluctantly accepts, is trained by Baba to shoot a gun, and kills his first target, none other than Rajan himself. He tells his friends about his good fortune, and they join forces with him. In all killing contracts they are provided with a photograph, the location, and are instructed to look at the photo just 15 minutes before killing the person. In this manner the friends enjoy their new-found wealth. When Aryan's Parsi girlfriend, Dilnawaaz finds out, she wants him to quit. He does, but his friends refuse to let go of this easy money and luxurious life. Shortly thereafter, the trio are given a contract; before the killing they look at the photograph ... of Aryan. The trio knows that it is too late to back out of this 'supari' (contract killing). Soon events takes a worst turn as one by one gets killed. Chicken commits suicide and a gun battle ensues where Papad and Mushy are killed with Sekhari's men. Aryan puts everything to an end by killing Mamta Sekhari and Baba once and for all.

Cast
 Uday Chopra as Aryan Pandit
 Rahul Dev as Papad
 Nandita Das as Mamta Shekari
 Purab Kohli as Chicken
 Nauheed Cyrusi as Dilnaswaaz 'Dillu'
 Irrfan Khan as Baba 
 Akashdeep Saigal as Mushy

Soundtrack

The music was composed by Vishal–Shekhar, with lyrics written by Vishal Dadlani and Javed Akhtar.

Reception
Supari received generally mixed reviews from critics. Shahid Khan from Planet Bollywood gave the film a 7/10 rating and praised the direction, editing and performances, especially that of Nandita Das, while criticizing Chopra's performance in a few scenes, the background score and the ending. Mithun Verma from Fullhyd.com similarly gave a 7/10, praising the characterizations, performances and shootout sequences, while criticizing the performances of Chopra and Das, and the editing. On the other hand, Taran Adarsh from Bollywood Hungama gave the film a 1/5 rating, feeling the screenplay and characterizations were "faulty" and found the action sequences ordinary. However, he praised the dialogues, songs and performances. Jitesh Pillai from The Times of India also gave it a 1/5 rating and criticized the performances, dialogue and overabundance of characters, while praising Dev's performance and the cinematography. Saibal Chatterjee from Hindustan Times similarly gave it 1 star and felt Chopra was "terribly miscast" for the action hero role.

Box Office
Supari opened with  0.45 crore on the first day of release. It grossed  1.25 crore in its first weekend, and  1.85 crore in its first week. The film's closing collections amounted to  2.65 crore. It was one of the biggest commercial failures of 2003.

References

External links

Supari at Yash Raj Films portal

2000s Hindi-language films
2003 action films
2003 crime drama films
Films scored by Sandesh Shandilya
2003 films
Films set in Mumbai
Films scored by Vishal–Shekhar
Indian action films
Indian crime drama films
Films distributed by Yash Raj Films
Indian gangster films
Films about contract killing in India